is a retired Japanese professional pitcher.

External links

Living people
1967 births
People from Narita, Chiba
Baseball people from Chiba Prefecture
Japanese baseball players
Nippon Professional Baseball pitchers
Nippon Ham Fighters players
Chunichi Dragons players
Hiroshima Toyo Carp players
Japanese baseball coaches
Nippon Professional Baseball coaches